John Cole (3 March 1933 – 25 May 2014) was a South African cricketer. He played first-class cricket for Western Province and Natal between 1959 and 1967.

References

External links
 

1933 births
2014 deaths
South African cricketers
Western Province cricketers
KwaZulu-Natal cricketers
Cricketers from Johannesburg